Effenberger is a German surname. Notable people with the surname include:

Florian Effenberger, Executive Director at The Document Foundation
Frank Effenberger, American electrical engineer
Josef Effenberger (1901–1983), Czechoslovak gymnast
Vratislav Effenberger (1923–1986), Czech literature theoretician

German-language surnames